Vana (or with diacrits, e.g. Váňa) may refer to:

 Vana, Gujarat, a village on Saraushtra peninsula, western India
 Vana State, a former princely state whose seat was in Vana, Gujarat
 Vana, Iran, a village in Mazandaran Province, Iran
 Váňa, a Czech surname
 Vána, a fictional character from J. R. R. Tolkien's legendarium
 Vana, wife of the legendary Swedish king Sveigðir